Neil Bedford Lucas PSM, JP (born 10 August 1945) was the Administrator of Christmas Island and Cocos (Keeling) Islands. He served in the office from January 2006 to October 2009, when he was replaced by Brian Lacy.

He was formerly the CEO for the City of Berwick, the Mayor of Casey, the State Member for Eumemmerring Province from 1996–2002, representing the Liberal Party, Parliamentary Secretary to the Leader of the Victorian Legislative Council and consultant to the Victorian Ministers for Local Government and Planning.

He was appointed a Justice of the Peace (JP) upon taking the position of Mayor of Casey.
In recognition of his significant contributions over the years Mr Lucas was awarded the Public Service Medal (PSM) in 1995 for outstanding public service to local government.

References

External links
 Official press release
 Parliament of Victoria - Lucas, Neil Bedford

Living people
1945 births
Members of the Victorian Legislative Council
Members of the Victorian Legislative Council for Eumemmerring Province
Liberal Party of Australia members of the Parliament of Victoria
Mayors of places in Victoria (Australia)
Christmas Island administrators
Recipients of the Public Service Medal (Australia)